Amaliegade 15–17 are two originally symmetrical, Rococo-style townhouses located close to Amalienborg Palace in the Frederiksstaden district of central Copenhagen, Denmark. The exterior of the buildings was designed by the architect Nicolai Eigtved who had also created the overall masterplan for the neighbourhood. The house at No. 15 was heightened with a half floor in 1891.

History

Bæsecke  and Pfeiffer 

The two buildings were built  in 1754-1756 for the two master stone carvers Georg Vilhelm Bæseke (No. 15) and Johan Peter Pfeiffer (1718-1771, No. 17). The buildings were built by G. D. Anthon (1714-1781) according to an exterior design created by Nicolai Eigtved. The stone work was executed by the owners.

In the bwq cadastre of 1756, the two properties were listed as No. 71 Z and No. 71 Æ. On Christian Gedde's map of St Ann's East Quarter, they were marked as No. 314 and No. 315.

1787 census
At the time of the 1787 census, No. 61 Z was home to three households. Christian Lytken, a Royal Danish Navy captain, resided in one of the apartments with his wife Charlotte Birgitte Clausen, their eight children (aged two to 12), a male servant, a maid, a female cook, a nanny and a lodger (a sailor). Christian Brandt, a kancelliråd, resided in the other apartment with his wife Charlotte Schiel, three maids, a female cook, rqi nake servants, a clerk, a coachman, a stableman and a caretaker. Søren Christensen, an innkeeper, resided in the building with his wife Christiane Sørens Datter, their two children aged one and three) and a female cook.

At the time of the 1787 census, No. 61 Æ was home to two households. Adam Ferdinand Molke, a counter admiral. resided in one of the apartments with his wife Catharina Sophia Wilhelmina Wedell, a housekeeper, a maid, a female cook, a male servant and a stableman. August Tideman, a corcierge, resided in the building with his wife Anne Peders Datter and a female cook.

The Moltke family

Count Adam Gottlob Moltke, the king's lord chamberlain, acquired No. 15 in 1761. His son, Joachim Godske Moltke, lived in the building in 1770-1784. Frederik Moltke (1754-1836) lived at No. 17 in the years around 1798 while Adam Wilhelm Moltke lived at No. 17 in 1807, then at  No. 15 from 1808 to 1830 and then again at No. 17 in 1831-1839. Carl von Moltke (1798-1866) was registered as a resident at No. 17 in 1856-1858.

Later history
Gyldendal publisher Jacob Hegel resided at No. 15 in 1010. Count and Countess Raben Lewetzau resided at No. 19.

Håndværksrådet was based in the building from at least the mid-1970s. It moved when its new building on Islands Brygge was inaugurated in the 2000s.

Architect
No. 15 was heightened by the architect Gotfred Tvede in 1892.

Today
No. 15 was acquired by Jeudan in 2019. The consulting firm Beyond Advisors is located in the building together with the fashion brand Baum und Pferdgarten, which is based on the first floor of the building. 

The Danish Dental Association is based at No. 17 along with a number of other related organisations and foundations.

Further reading
  Ejlersen, Torben: Stenhuggerne G. W. Bæsecke og J. P. Pheiffer. Indblik i Amaliegade 15 og 17. Historiske Meddelelser om København 1977.

References

External links

 Amaliegade at indenforvoldene.dk
 Amaliegade 15-17 at arkark.dk

Listed residential buildings in Copenhagen
Rococo architecture in Copenhagen
Houses completed in 1756
Buildings and structures in Denmark associated with the Moltke family